Kivimäki is a Finnish surname. Notable people with the surname include:

 Toivo Mikael Kivimäki (1886–1968), Prime Minister of Finland 1932–1936
 Timo Kivimäki, professor of international politics at the University of Copenhagen
 Erkki Kivimäki (1936–2007), Finnish diplomat
 Samuli Kivimäki (1988–), Finnish ice hockey player

Finnish-language surnames